Bykov, or Bykova (feminine; Быкова), is a common Russian last name, derived from the word "бык" (bull), and may refer to:

People
Aleksandr Bykov (born 1953), Soviet fencer
Alexander Vladimirovich Bykov (born 1962), Russian historian and numismatist
Anatoly Bykov (born 1960), Russian businessman
Anatoly Bykov (wrestler) (born 1953), Soviet wrestler
Artem Bykov (born 1992), Belarusian footballer
Boris Bykov (born 1935), Soviet intelligence officer 
Dmitry Bykov (born 1967), a Russian writer
Dmitri Bykov (ice hockey) (born 1977), a Russian professional hockey player
Elisaveta Bykova (1913–1989), Soviet chess player and Women's World Chess Champion
Leonid Bykov (1928–1979), Soviet actor, film director, and script writer
Pyotr Bykov (1844–1930), Russian literary historian, editor, poet and translator
Rolan Bykov (1929–1998), Soviet/Russian actor, film director, and script writer
Roman Bykov (born 1992), Russian football player
Sergei Bykov (born 1983), Russian basketball player and coach
Vasil Bykov (1924–2003), Belarusian writer
Viktor Bykov (born 1945), Soviet cyclist from Ukraine
Vladimir Bykov, Russian oncologist
Vyacheslav Bykov (born 1960), Soviet ice hockey player and head coach for the Russian national hockey team

Places
 Býkov-Láryšov, a small village in the Moravian-Silesian Region of the Czech Republic
 Bykov, Sakhalin Oblast, a former urban-type settlement in Sakhalin Oblast, Russia; since 2004—a rural settlement
 Bykovsky channel or Bykov, a major distributary of the Lena River
 Bykov Mys a half island on the Lena River Delta, Sakha Republic, Russia
 4682 Bykov, minor planet

See also
 Bykhaw, a city in Belarus

Russian-language surnames